Fat Albert is a 2004 American live-action/animated comedy film based on the 1972 Filmation animated television series Fat Albert and the Cosby Kids created by Bill Cosby. Kenan Thompson stars as the title character. Fat Albert transforms the cartoon characters into three-dimensional humans, who have to come to grips with the differences that exist between their world and the real world.

The film acts as a continuation of the series; Fat Albert and the gang leave their 1970s cartoon world, and enter the 2000s real world to help a teenage girl, Doris Robertson (Kyla Pratt), deal with the challenges of being unpopular. The film was released on December 25, 2004, and grossed $48 million against a $45 million budget.

It has a 23% approval rating on Rotten Tomatoes, which calls it "bland but good-natured" in its critical consensus.

Plot
In North Philadelphia, Doris Robertson is a depressed teenager grieving the death of her grandfather and resisting her foster sister Lauri's efforts to engage socially. Upon learning that her parents will be away for a two day business trip to the Poconos, Doris' tear hits her television remote, as Fat Albert and the Cosby Kids is on. When the tear opens up a portal to the cartoon world, Fat Albert jumps out of the television upon seeing Doris (except real-life), knowing she has a problem.

Rudy, Dumb Donald, Mushmouth, Bucky, and Old Weird Harold jump out, too; Bill tells Russell to stay put and cover for them. Doris insists she is fine, but the gang knows otherwise. When the show ends, they have to wait until tomorrow's show to come back. They follow Doris to school and are amazed by the new technology.

Albert becomes infatuated with Lauri. Reggie, an annoying schoolmate with an obsessive crush on Lauri, challenges Albert to a track race that Albert wins. In another attempt to help Doris, the gang persuades cheerleaders to invite them all to an outdoor party. With some reluctance, Doris agrees to attend. While at the party, Lauri dances with Albert. Reggie desperately attempts to make her jealous by dancing with Doris. When Lauri does not notice him, he tries to forcibly kiss Doris. Doris yells at him and runs off. Albert warns the boy to stay away from Doris.

The next day, Doris goes to school but asks the gang to go to the park instead of following her. Harold, normally clumsy, joins in a basketball game and is able to play perfectly. Mushmouth, who cannot talk normally, is taught how to speak by a little girl. Donald goes to the library, where he can read and remove his pink face covering hat.

When Doris takes them home, three of the gang members – Bucky, Harold, and Donald – jump into the television. Breaking News interrupts the show before the other four can enter. Albert, Doris and Bill have an argument in private about going back. The gang takes Doris and Lauri to a fair on a junk made car. Doris says she would date Rudy if he was a real person when he asks.

Searching for guidance, Fat Albert meets his creator, Bill Cosby, and tells him of the dilemma. Though frightened and skeptical at first, Cosby proceeds to explain to him that his character is based on Doris' grandfather, Albert Robertson, which explains Doris' confusion over why Fat Albert seems so familiar. Mr. Cosby warns Fat Albert he has to return to the cartoon world, or he will turn into celluloid dust.

Devastated, Albert tells Lauri he must leave, but she thinks he is being insensitive. The next day, Mushmouth, Rudy, and Bill jump back into the television. Albert goes to a track meet where Doris and Lauri are competing and encourages Doris to a victory. Reggie, who witnessed that the gang is from the television, attempts to threaten Albert, but he pushes him aside. Albert rushes to the girls' house on a borrowed skateboard. He says goodbye to Doris and Lauri and jumps back into the television, and manages to take back the focus of the show from a gang of bullies that threatened to do so earlier in the film, as seen by Russell.

Sometime later, Cosby, his brother, and their friends who helped inspire the cartoon characters from the show, stand in front of their old friend Albert Robertson's grave. As the camera pans on each of the men, images of their counterparts are seen. Doris watches them from afar as the old men race away, showing that they are still kids at heart, the same kids from the television show that they helped Bill Cosby inspire. Before the ending credits start, Fat Albert encourages the audience to finish watching the credits and help each other.

Cast

Production
Early in development, Omar Benson Miller was set to play the titular character with Forest Whitaker serving as director. However, they were replaced by Kenan Thompson and Joel Zwick respectively due to creative differences between Whitaker and Bill Cosby. David Gordon Green expressed interest in directing the film and claimed he lobbied for the director's chair by personally writing a letter to Cosby.

Home media
Fat Albert was released on VHS and DVD on March 22, 2005.

Reception
On Rotten Tomatoes, the film has an approval rating of 23% based on 89 reviews, and an average rating of 4.4/10. The website's critical reads, "A bland but good-natured adaptation of the cartoon show." On Metacritic, the film holds a weighted average score of 39 out of 100, based on 26 critics, indicating "generally unfavorable reviews". Audiences polled by CinemaScore gave the film an average grade of "A−" on an A+ to F scale.

Roger Ebert gave the film 2 stars out of a possible 4, writing: "The movie is sweet and gentle, but not very compelling."

The film grossed $48.1 million in the United States and a total of $48.6 million worldwide, against a $45 million budget.

References

External links

 
 
 
 
 

2004 films
2000s children's comedy films
2000s English-language films
2000s fantasy comedy films
2004 romantic comedy films
2000s teen romance films
20th Century Fox films
American films with live action and animation
American children's comedy films
American children's fantasy films
American fantasy comedy films
American romantic comedy films
American teen romance films
African-American comedy films
Davis Entertainment films
Films about bullying
Films directed by Joel Zwick
Films produced by John Davis
Films scored by Richard Gibbs
Films set in 2004
Films set in Pennsylvania
Films set in Philadelphia
Live-action films based on animated series
Cultural depictions of Bill Cosby
African-American animated films
2000s American films